Luxor Las Vegas is a 30-story (106.7 meter tall) casino hotel situated on the southern end of the Las Vegas Strip in Paradise, Nevada. The hotel is owned by Vici Properties and operated by MGM Resorts International and has a  casino with over 2,000 slot machines and 87 table games.

The casino opened in 1993 and was renovated and expanded several times. Later renovation work modernized the design of the property and raised the hotel's capacity to 4,407 rooms, including 442 suites. The hotel's rooms line the interior walls of the main tower, which has a pyramid shape, and the 22-story twin ziggurat towers.

The hotel is named for the city of Luxor (ancient Thebes) in Egypt.

History

Construction and opening
The resort was announced by Circus Circus Enterprises on November 14, 1991. Known temporarily as "Project X", the pyramid-shaped resort would cost $290 million, and would be built on the Las Vegas Strip, on land located south of the company's Excalibur Hotel and Casino. Groundbreaking took place on April 21, 1992, with the project by then known as "Luxor", after the Egyptian city of the same name. Veldon Simpson was the architect, and Perini Building Company was the general contractor. Waltek, a Cincinnati-based company, provided the metal-and-glass exterior for the pyramid. Standing 30 stories high, the pyramid was one of the largest metal-and-glass projects ever. The pyramid was topped off on July 9, 1993. The Luxor would compete against two other upcoming resorts, MGM Grand and Treasure Island. All three resorts had a family oriented focus.

The resort officially opened at 4 a.m. on October 15, 1993, to a crowd of 10,000 people. When it opened, the pyramid, which cost $375 million to build, was the tallest building on the strip and contained 2,526 rooms and a  casino. The resort was financed by "petty cash" earned from other Circus Circus Enterprises properties and did not include any outside financial investors. The hotel's pyramid is similar in size to the Red Pyramid and Bent Pyramid of Egypt. When the hotel opened, it was the tallest structure on the Strip, surpassed after only 11 days by Treasure Island, and featured the world's largest atrium, which has since been surpassed.

Renovations
A $240 million expansion occurred in 1996, and included an IMAX theater. A theater and two additional towers totaling 2,000 rooms were added in 1998 for $675 million.

In July 2007, owner MGM Resorts International announced plans to thoroughly renovate the Luxor, spending $300 million to remodel 80% of Luxor's public areas, removing much of the ancient Egyptian theme and replacing it with more adult-oriented and modern lounges, restaurants and clubs.

Incidents
On May 7, 2007, a vehicle exploded in a Luxor Hotel parking garage due to a homemade pipe bomb which left one man dead. Local authorities believe the victim, a 24-year-old employee at Nathan's Famous hot dog restaurant in the Luxor food court, was the intended target. The hotel was not evacuated, operations continued uninterrupted, and the parking structure as well as the casino were undamaged. Two men were found guilty of the bombing, and in 2010 were sentenced to life imprisonment without the possibility of parole.

Facilities
Luxor Las Vegas includes  of convention space, four swimming pools and whirlpools, a wedding chapel, Nurture Spa and Salon, and 29 retail stores. As of 2010, the Luxor was designated as a 4 Key rating from the Green Key Eco-Rating Program, which evaluates what is known as "sustainable hotel operations." The hotel features inclined elevators which travel up the side of the building on a 39-degree incline.

The Atrium

Attractions
The Luxor is home to four shows: "Fantasy" (a topless revue), comedian Carrot Top, the Blue Man Group, and America's Got Talent - Las Vegas Live!

Since 2009, the resort has hosted Bodies: The Exhibition, an educational display on the human body, and Titanic: The Artifact Exhibition; the exhibits replaced the hotel's three-story arcade.

Former attractions
At its opening, the resort featured the Nile River Tour, a river ride that carried guests to different parts of the pyramid and passed by pieces of ancient artwork on a river that encircled the casino. It was removed after three years.

The hotel also featured King Tut's Tomb and Museum, a replica of King Tutankhamen's tomb as found in the Valley of the Kings in Egypt. It was closed in June 2008 and its replica artifacts were donated to the Las Vegas Natural History Museum where they are displayed in its "Treasures of Egypt" exhibit, which opened January 30, 2010.

Secrets of the Luxor Pyramid was a collection of three attractions which also debuted at the hotel's opening, including:
In Search of the Obelisk
Luxor Live
Theater of Time

Theater of Time was replaced with an IMAX Cinema, which operated from 1996 to 2008.

From 2000 to 2005, the Luxor Theatre was the home of the performance-art show Blue Man Group, which then moved to the Venetian Las Vegas. They returned to the Luxor Theatre on November 18, 2015.

Clubs
On August 31, 2007, LAX Nightclub officially opened at a party hosted by Britney Spears. A number of other celebrities, including Christina Aguilera, also hosted events at the club. The two-level,  venue contained 78 VIP tables and Noir Bar, which according to the Las Vegas Review Journal was an "ultra-elite bar" with a reservations-only policy. LAX Nightclub was closed on April 1, 2017 and was transformed into an esports venue, Esports Arena Las Vegas. Work on the Esports Arena began in July 2017 and completed in March 2018.

Additional nightlife destinations within Luxor include CatHouse, Aurora, Liquidity, and Flight.

Luxor Sky Beam

At 42.3 billion candela, the Luxor Sky Beam is the strongest beam of light in the world, using curved mirrors to collect the light from 39 xenon lamps and focus them into one intense, narrow beam.

Each of the 39 lamps is a 7,000 watt Xenotech fixture costing about $1,200. At full power, the system costs $51 an hour to operate, with $20 per hour of that just for its 315,000 watts of electricity.
The beam has operated reliably since it was first activated on October 15, 1993.

The room's temperature is about  while the lights are operating.
Since 2008, only half the lamps have been lit as a cost- and energy-saving measure.

Location
Luxor is at the southern end of the Las Vegas Strip, flanked by the Mandalay Bay to the south and the Excalibur to the north. All three are connected by the Mandalay Bay Tram, as well as by walkways. The Shoppes of Mandalay Bay, a boutique shopping centre, is on a bridge over Mandalay Bay Road, directly connecting the Luxor with the Mandalay Bay resort to the south. All three properties were built by Circus Circus Enterprises, which in 1999 became Mandalay Resort Group, which was then succeeded by MGM Mirage in April 2005 (now named MGM Resorts International).

Usage in popular culture
This destination hotel is often viewed as a prime example of 1990s Postmodern architecture, and appeared on the cover of architecture scholar James Steele's book Architecture Today. Since opening in 1993, it has appeared in numerous films, including Mars Attacks! (1996), where a major character is depicted as an employee of the hotel, dressed in an Egyptian costume; and the film 2012.

In Up in the Air, George Clooney's character, Ryan Bingham, is asked to take a picture in front of the Luxor hotel. The hotel was also seen in the movies Showgirls and The Hangover. A futuristic but abandoned version of the hotel is seen in Blade Runner 2049, along with other famous landmarks in a post-apocalyptic Las Vegas.

The hotel was featured in the climax of Angry Video Game Nerd: The Movie, where it is among the famous landmarks that was destroyed by Death Mwauthzyx. 

The hotel has also been featured in the television shows Fear Factor, Criss Angel Mindfreak, Great Hotels, and CSI. A replica of the Luxor, named "The Camel's Toe", appeared in the Las Venturas area of the video game Grand Theft Auto: San Andreas, and another replica appeared in the Las Vegas area of the 2000 video game Driver 2. The Luxor Las Vegas also appears in Futurama episode, "Viva Mars Vegas". It also appears in Vegas Vacation starring Chevy Chase. Tupac Shakur also stayed in The Luxor in September 1996 when he was gunned down on the strip after the Mike Tyson-Bruce Seldon fight on September 7, 1996. Will Smith filmed the 1998 video for "Gettin' Jiggy Wit It" in the hotel's lobby and in front of its sphinx.

Gallery

See also

 Cathedral of light
 spectra (installation)
 A Symphony of Lights
 Tribute in Light
 List of tallest pyramids

References

External links

 Luxor Hotel website
 Aerial image

1993 establishments in Nevada
Architecture of the Las Vegas Valley
Hotel buildings completed in 1993
Hotels established in 1993
Casinos completed in 1993
Casino hotels
Casinos in the Las Vegas Valley
Landmarks in Nevada
Las Vegas Strip
Mandalay Resort Group
MGM Resorts International
Novelty buildings in Nevada
Pyramids in the United States
Resorts in the Las Vegas Valley
Skyscraper hotels in Paradise, Nevada
Esports venues in Nevada